Salvador is the debut album by Irish music producer and musician, Salvador Navarrete, known better by his stage name, Sega Bodega. It was released via his NUXXE label on 14 February 2020.

Working largely as a record producer up until the album's release, Salvador often showcases a more personal side of Navarrete's musicianship, exploring themes of religion, addiction, romantic and sexual relationships, as well as a close friend's suicide.

It was supported by the singles "U Suck", and "Salv Goes to Hollywood".

Track listing 
All tracks written and produced by Sega Bodega.

Personnel 
Credits adapted from the album's vinyl liner notes.

 Sega Bodega – vocals, production
 Conall Ingus – additional vocals ("Raising Hell")
 Mette – additional vocals ("Raising Hell")
 Oklou – additional vocals ("Raising Hell")
 Shygirl – additional vocals ("Raising Hell")
 Zebra Katz – additional vocals ("Raising Hell")
 Paul Glacial – additional vocals ("U Got The Fever")
 Sarah Lamb – whistling ("U Got The Fever")
 Coucou Chloe – additional vocals ("Smell Of The Rubber")
 Mimi Wade – additional vocals ("U Suck")
 Lucinda Chua – cello ("Kuvasz In Snow")
 Lauta – additional vocals ("Kuvasz In Snow")
 Caroline Polachek – additional vocals ("Heaven Fell (Reprise)")
 James Rand – mixing
 Robin Petras – mastering
 James Gould – photography
 David Kelly – design

Release history

References 

2020 debut albums